Blood Bound is a song by the Swedish Power and Heavy metal band HammerFall, released on January 28, 2005. It was the only single released from their fifth studio album Chapter V: Unbent, Unbowed, Unbroken.
The instrumental/karaoke version on the album was linked with a competition where fans could send their version of "Blood Bound" to Nuclear Blast and win a meet and greet with the members of HammerFall on their shows in April 2005.The artwork was made by Samwise Didier following an original idea by Joacim Cans and Oscar Dronjak.

Track listing

Enhanced part contains a screensaver and 3 wallpapers (in .jpg format).
The track "Blood Bound" was also made into a music video.

Charts

Weekly charts

Year-end charts

Personnel

Joacim Cans      – lead vocals
Oscar Dronjak    – rhythm guitar, backing vocals
Stefan Elmgren   – lead guitar
Magnus Rosén     – bass
Anders Johansson – drums

Additional personnel

Additional backing vocals by:
Rolf Köhler
Olaf Zenkbiel
Mats Rendlert
Joacim Lundberg
Markus Sköld
Johan Aremyr

External links
Official HammerFall website
Album information
Lyrics at Darklyrics

References

2005 songs
HammerFall songs
Nuclear Blast Records singles
2005 singles
Songs written by Oscar Dronjak
Songs written by Joacim Cans
Songs written by Jesper Strömblad